Khalifeh Kandi (also Romanized as Khalīfeh Kandī) is a village in Bayat Rural District, Nowbaran District, Saveh County, Markazi Province, Iran. At the 2006 census, its population was 270, in 79 families.

References 

Populated places in Saveh County